Incadronic acid (INN, trade name Bisphonal) is a bisphosphonate.

References

Bisphosphonates
Farnesyl pyrophosphate synthase inhibitors